This was the first edition of the tournament since 2008.

The brothers Ken and Neal Skupski won the tournament, defeating Marcus Daniell and Marcelo Demoliner in the final, 6–3, 6–4.

Seeds

Draw

Draw

External Links
 Main Draw

2015 Aegon Surbiton Trophy - Men's Doubles
2015 Men's Doubles